Maluku FC (or Maluku Football Club) is an Indonesian professional football club founded on 27 January 2021 and headquartered in Ambon, Maluku province. They currently compete in the Liga 3.

History
Maluku FC was founded on 27 January 2021, with an aim of promoting football in Maluku, which has long been absent from its relevant representative.

On 25 September 2021, Maluku FC made league match debut in a 7–1 win against Binatama Bupolo at the Kompi A Yonif 733/Raider Waiheru field, the achievement of 3 points at the same time led the club to top the provisional standings of Group B Liga 3 Maluku.

On 12 October 2021, 2021 Liga 3 Maluku has been held and Maluku FC has become the champion to represent the province at the national level, not only being a regional champion, Maluku FC has been undefeated in the struggle in the league zone since the competition was held on September 23, 2021. In the final match, they  win against Gemba with a score 1–0.

Stadium
Maluku FC uses the Mandala Remaja Stadium in Ambon for their home matches.

Honours
 Liga 3 Maluku
 Champions (2): 2021, 2022

References

External links

Ambon, Maluku
Football clubs in Maluku (province)
Football clubs in Indonesia
Association football clubs established in 2021
2021 establishments in Indonesia